
Kadina may refer to:

Australia

New South Wales
 Kadina, New South Wales, a locality
 Kadina High School

South Australia
 Kadina, South Australia, a town and locality
 Kadina Cemetery
 Kadina Town Hall, a town hall in South Australia
 Corporate Town of Kadina, a former local government area 
 District Council of Kadina, a former local government area 
 Hundred of Kadina, a cadastral unit in South Australia

North Macedonia
 Kadina River a water course in the Republic of North Macedonia

See also
 Kadena